Holywell Workhouse Chapel was built in association with Holywell Workhouse in Old Chester Road, Holywell, Flintshire, Wales.  It was built, together with some "vagrants' wards" for the workhouse, in 1883–84 to a design by the Chester architect John Douglas.

The chapel is built in stone with a slate roof and has a shingled flèche.  The workhouse later became Lluesty Hospital.  The chapel is designated by Cadw as Grade II  listed building.

See also
List of new churches by John Douglas

References

Buildings and structures in Flintshire
Chapels in Flintshire
John Douglas buildings
Churches completed in 1884
19th-century churches in the United Kingdom
Gothic Revival church buildings in Wales